The Billings-Cole House is a historic house at 725 East Page Avenue in Malvern, Arkansas.  It is a roughly cubical two story structure, set on a sloping lot with a partially exposed basement. A flat-roof porch wraps around its northeast corner, and a flat-roof carport extends to its west.  A porch and patio extend on top of the carport.  The house was designed in 1948 by Irven Donald McDaniel, a local architect, for Dr. A. A. Billings, and is a distinctive transitional work between the Art Moderne and International styles.  The carport was added in 1952, and its basement redesigned by McDaniel for Dr. John W. Cole for use as a doctor's office.

The house was listed on the National Register of Historic Places in 2015.

See also
National Register of Historic Places listings in Hot Spring County, Arkansas

References

Houses on the National Register of Historic Places in Arkansas
Houses completed in 1948
Houses in Hot Spring County, Arkansas
National Register of Historic Places in Hot Spring County, Arkansas
Buildings and structures in Malvern, Arkansas
1948 establishments in Arkansas
Art Moderne architecture in Arkansas
International style architecture in Arkansas